Tin Chak Estate is a public housing estate in Tin Shui Wai, New Territories, Hong Kong, near Light Rail Tin Yat stop. It consists of nine residential buildings completed in 2001.

Houses

Demographics
According to the 2016 by-census, Tin Chak Estate had a population of 11,695. The median age was 43.8 and the majority of residents (96.8 per cent) were of Chinese ethnicity. The average household size was 3 people. The median monthly household income of all households (i.e. including both economically active and inactive households) was HK$24,000.

Politics
Tin Chak Estate is located in Yat Chak constituency of the Yuen Long District Council. It is currently represented by Wong Wing-sze, who was elected in the 2019 elections.

See also

Public housing estates in Tin Shui Wai

References

Tin Shui Wai
Public housing estates in Hong Kong
Residential buildings completed in 2001
2001 establishments in Hong Kong